Burnett Mitchell Chiperfield (June 14, 1870 – June 24, 1940) was a U.S. Representative from Illinois, father of Robert Bruce Chiperfield.

Early life and military service
Born in Dover, Illinois, Chiperfield attended the public schools of Illinois and Hamline University, St. Paul, Minnesota, and later studied law. He was admitted to the bar in 1891 and was a lawyer in private practice and prosecuting attorney for Fulton County, Illinois from 1896 to 1900. He served as a member of the Illinois House of Representatives from 1903 to 1913. He was secretary and trustee of the Western Illinois State Normal School (now Western Illinois University), Macomb, Illinois from 1904 to 1909.

He served as an officer in the Illinois National Guard for twenty years. He served in the Spanish–American War, and was later in the United States Army Judge Advocate General's Corps from 1917 to 1919 and 1921 to 1934 and rose to the rank of lieutenant colonel. In this capacity, he investigated claims of subversion in the Army and he also oversaw dozens of courts-martial. He also served in France during World War I, and was in civil affairs with the Army of Occupation in Koblenz after the war.

He was also a banker.

Congressional career
Chiperfield was an unsuccessful candidate for election to the Sixty-third Congress in 1912. He was elected as a Republican to the Sixty-fourth Congress (March 4, 1915 – March 3, 1917). He did not seek renomination, but was an unsuccessful candidate for the United States Senate. He served as delegate to the Republican National Conventions in 1920 and 1936.

Chiperfield was elected simultaneously as a Republican to the Seventy-first and Seventy-second Congresses to fill the vacancy caused by the death of United States Representative-elect Edward J. King (November 4, 1930 – March 3, 1933).

He was an unsuccessful candidate for reelection to the Seventy-third Congress in 1932 and for election to the Seventy-fourth Congress in 1934.

He died on June 24, 1940 in Canton, Illinois, and was interred in Greenwood Cemetery.

References

  Retrieved on 2009-5-15

External links

1870 births
1940 deaths
Civil affairs of the United States military
Hamline University alumni
Republican Party members of the Illinois House of Representatives
People from Bureau County, Illinois
People from Canton, Illinois
Western Illinois University people
American military personnel of the Spanish–American War
American prosecutors
Illinois lawyers
Illinois National Guard personnel
Republican Party members of the United States House of Representatives from Illinois
Military personnel from Illinois
United States Army Judge Advocate General's Corps
United States Army officers